Elizabeth D. A. Magnus Cohen (February 22, 1820 – May 28, 1921) was the first woman licensed to practice medicine in the state of Louisiana in the United States.

Early life and education 
She was born on February 22, 1820, at 205 Hudson Street, New York City, to Phoebe (née Magnus) and David Cohen of England. She later married Dr. Aaron Cohen in New York and they had five children together.

After the death of her first son to measles, she devoted her life to medicine – citing that more should have been done to save her son. She therefore decided to "become a doctor [herself] and help mothers to keep their little ones well." She challenged the contemporary Jewish stereotype that sons should be the ones who chased professional attainments such as becoming doctors.

Medical school 
Following the death of her first son from measles,[1] she attended medical school in Philadelphia starting in 1853 at the Female Medical College of Pennsylvania.[1][3] She applied and was accepted into medical school in Philadelphia in 1854 at the Female Medical College of Pennsylvania, which in 1867 was renamed Women's Medical College of Pennsylvania. This was during a time where women professionals, especially in medicine –  were severely frowned upon. She later graduated in 1857, 5th in her class of 36, her thesis was titled "Prolapsus Uteri".

Religion 
She had no obvious display of Judaism during her life, but her dedication to her faith was rendered clear in a written statement she made in 1902 to her brother: "I am not sure what I will have in the hereafter, so I am trying to enjoy what is given to me here … I am … trying my very best to be good according to my ideas of goodness—that is to live in the fear of God and keeping his ten commandments". Her choice in infirmary following her retirement in 1887 solidified her dedication to Judaism.

Career and life 

In 1857, after graduation, she relocated to join her husband in New Orleans. She immediately gained the attention of the city's medical society and was greeted with enthusiasm. For thirty years from 1857 to 1887, she cared for the people of the French Quarter of New Orleans in a period which was marked by periodic epidemics of yellow fever and smallpox. During the majority of her service, she treated mostly women and children in a private medical practice she had established. She recalled and described it as "attend[ing] to families through generations". She was also quoted as saying "They needed me, when I came here" in a Times-Picayune interview. Despite these achievements, she still faced heavy discrimination and was consequently listed in the city directory as a midwife in 1867. She was then included as a doctoress, in 1869. It was not until the year 1876 when she finally received the title of M.D, as Mrs. Elizabeth Cohen, physician.

She retired from her practice in 1887. During her New Orleans Times-Picayune interview, she recalled having to ask the registrar to "M.D. after [her] name" while being admitted as a resident of the Touro Infirmary’s "Department of the Aged and Infirm" in 1888. During her time there, she volunteered in the sewing and linen room.

In an interview in February 1920 for her 100th birthday, she made it very clear that she was still invested in current events. She was particularly interested in the 19th amendment that was to be implemented later that year. She was quoted as saying, "I’m glad to see the girls of today getting an education," "In my youth you had to fight for it... And I believe in suffrage, too – things will be better when women can vote and can protect their own property and their own children. Even if I am a hundred, I’m for votes for women."

Death and legacy 
Cohen died in New Orleans, Louisiana, on May 28, 1921, at the age of 101. She was buried at Gates of Prayer Cemetery in New Orleans and her tombstone included M.D. after her name.

One of her former medical offices is located at 1032 Saint Charles Ave, New Orleans on Lee Circle, built in 1883 and is home to the Circle Bar (as of 2020).

References

Further reading 

Blackmar, Mrs. K.K. "New Orleans First Woman Doctor." New Orleans Daily Picayune, January 26, 1913; 
Duffy, John, ed. The Rudolph Matas History of Medicine in Louisiana (1962)
O'Brien, Sharon, ed. "The Attic Letters of Elizabeth D. A. Cohen, M. D." Tourovues: The Magazine of Touro Infirmary (Summer 1977)
Samuels, Marguerite. "Woman Doctor Celebrates Her 100th Birthday." New Orleans Times-Picayune, February 22, 1920

External links

Dr. Elizabeth D. A. Magnus Cohen, M.D Biography, National Institutes of Health, U.S. National Library of Medicine

1820 births
1921 deaths
19th-century American physicians
19th-century American women physicians
People from New York City
Physicians from Louisiana
American centenarians
American people of English-Jewish descent
Woman's Medical College of Pennsylvania alumni
Women centenarians
Burials in Louisiana